The Godswill Akpabio International Stadium (formerly Akwa Ibom International Stadium) is an all-seater national sports stadium located in Uyo, the state capital of Akwa Ibom. The stadium serves as a home to the Nigerian Super Eagles as well as a center for various social, cultural, and religious events. The  contract for the construction of the Akwa Ibom International Stadium complex and Games Village was awarded in 2012 to Julius Berger and was completed in 2014. The 30,000 seater ultra modern multipurpose sports complex was modeled after Allianz Arena.

Governor Udom Gabriel Emmanuel renamed Akwa Ibom Stadium as Godswill Obot Akpabio International Stadium, immediately following his inauguration ceremony on May 29, 2015, in the stadium. Godswill Akpabio was the immediate past governor of the state.

Construction and Architecture
The contract for the design of the stadium was awarded to Julius Berger  a  structural engineering firm based in Nigeria. They were responsible for the architectural design, execution planning, as well as constructional supervision of the stadium, as well as maintenance. The stadium which seats on 48 hectares of land has some unique features such as bullet proof VIP/VVIP sections, collapsible seats, two digital score boards, digital playback screens, digital flood lights, and 30 emergency exits.

Structure
The stadium structure is in two phases which includes a 400m-running track for athletic events, and is the pilot part of Uyo Sports Park development, and is enclosed by a white triangular-shaped outer covering that encircles the whole spectator stand. The East Stand and Curves can seat approximately 22,500 people. The Governors’ Lounge has sitting capacity for between 30 and 40 VVIPs and is located in the Grand Stand on Level Two. It is constructed to carry little more than 30,000 spectators whether for soccer or track and field events, while the Grand Stand can comfortably accommodate about 7,500 spectators, including the VIP/VVIPs. There is also a six-lane track built specifically for athletes to train.

Facilities
The Stadium itself consists of:
30,000 capacity covered main bowl
Bullet Proof VVIP/VIP areas
Box office
Media facilities
Two scoreboards that comprise electronic scoreboard and video facilities for replays
Floodlights
Eight-lane 400m standard track
Warm-up facility with six-lane 400m track
A standby power supply system
30 emergency exit points
7,500 seater Grand Stand 
Helipad
Two dressing rooms
Ambulance bay

The Akwa Ibom International Stadium meets the requirements of the International safety standards; it is equipped with emergency service units (to enable exit within 6 minutes), closed circuit security cameras as well as crowd control steel fencing. There are also stand-by fire fighting equipment and metal detectors which have been put in place to avoid any misfortunes. The stadium has been slated to host the AFCON qualifying series against South Africa on 17 November. Local team Akwa United moved into the stadium in 2015 when their ground was being brought up to code.

See also
Akwa Ibom Christmas Carols Festival
List of stadiums in Nigeria
Akwa Ibom State

References

Multi-purpose stadiums in Nigeria
Indoor arenas in Nigeria
Buildings and structures in Uyo
Sports venues completed in 2014
Football venues in Nigeria
Athletics (track and field) venues in Nigeria
Landmarks in Nigeria
2014 establishments in Nigeria
Akwa Ibom
Akwa United F.C.
Dakkada F.C.
21st-century architecture in Nigeria